A gravity train is a theoretical means of transportation for purposes of commuting between two points on the surface of a sphere, by following a straight tunnel connecting the two points through the interior of the sphere.

In a large body such as a planet, this train could be left to accelerate using just the force of gravity, since during the first half of the trip (from the point of departure until the middle), the downward pull towards the center of gravity would pull it towards the destination. During the second half of the trip, the acceleration would be in the opposite direction relative to the trajectory, but, ignoring the effects of friction, the speed acquired before would be exactly enough to overcome this deceleration, and as a result, the train's speed would reach zero at precisely the moment the train reached its destination.

Origin of the concept
In the 17th century, British scientist Robert Hooke presented the idea of an object accelerating inside a planet in a letter to Isaac Newton. A gravity train project was seriously presented to the French Academy of Sciences in the 19th century. The same idea was proposed, without calculation, by Lewis Carroll in 1893 in Sylvie and Bruno Concluded. The idea was rediscovered in the 1960s when physicist Paul Cooper published a paper in the American Journal of Physics suggesting that gravity trains be considered for a future transportation project.

Mathematical considerations
Under the assumption of a spherical planet with uniform density, and ignoring relativistic effects as well as friction, a gravity train has the following properties:

 The duration of a trip depends only on the density of the planet and the gravitational constant, but not on the diameter of the planet.
 The maximum speed is reached at the middle point of the trajectory.

For gravity trains between points which are not the antipodes of each other, the following hold:

 The shortest time tunnel through a homogeneous earth is a hypocycloid; in the special case of two antipodal points, the hypocycloid degenerates to a straight line.
 All straight-line gravity trains on a given planet take exactly the same amount of time to complete a journey (that is, no matter where on the surface the two endpoints of its trajectory are located).

On the planet Earth specifically, since a gravity train's movement is the projection of a very Low Earth Orbit satellite's movement onto a line, it has the following parameters:

 The travel time equals 2530.30 seconds (nearly 42.2 minutes, half the period of a Low Earth Orbit satellite), assuming Earth were a perfect sphere of uniform density.
 By taking into account the realistic density distribution inside the Earth, as known from the Preliminary Reference Earth Model, the expected fall-through time is reduced from 42 to 38 minutes.
 For a train that goes directly through the center of the Earth, the maximum speed is equivalent to Earth's first cosmic velocity, also known as its orbital velocity ⁠that which will bring a rocket or other projectile into orbit around Earth (a slower projectile falling back to Earth, a faster one escaping Earth's gravity altogether) ⁠about 7,900 meters per second (28,440 km/h), equivalent to Mach 23.2 at sea level and standard temperature.

To put some numbers in perspective, the deepest current bore hole is the Kola Superdeep Borehole with a true depth of 12,262 meters; covering the distance between London and Paris (350 km) via a hypocycloidical path would require the creation of a hole 111,408 metres deep. Not only is such a depth 9 times as great, but it would also necessitate a tunnel that passes through the Earth's mantle.

Mathematical derivation
Using the approximations that the Earth is perfectly spherical and of uniform density , and the fact that within a uniform hollow sphere there is no gravity, the gravitational acceleration  experienced by a body within the Earth is proportional to the ratio of the distance from the center  to the Earth's radius . This is because underground at distance  from the center is like being on the surface of a planet of radius , within a hollow sphere which contributes nothing.

Diametric path to antipodes
In the case of a straight line through the center of the Earth, the acceleration of the body is equal to that of gravity: it is falling freely straight down.  We start falling at the surface, so at time  (treating acceleration and velocity as positive downwards):

Differentiating twice: 

where .  This class of problems, where there is a restoring force proportional to the displacement away from zero, has general solutions of the form , and describes simple harmonic motion such as in a spring or pendulum.

In this case  so that , we begin at the surface at time zero, and oscillate back and forth forever.

Using simple approximations of  that time is

Straight path between two arbitrary points

For the more general case of the straight line path between any two points on the surface of a sphere we calculate the acceleration of the body as it moves frictionlessly along its straight path.

The body travels along AOB, O being the midpoint of the path, and the closest point to the center of the Earth on this path.  At distance  along this path, the force of gravity depends on distance  to the center of the Earth as above.  Using the shorthand  for length OC:

The resulting acceleration on the body, because is it on a frictionless
inclined surface, is :

So the remaining analysis is the same, accommodating the initial condition that the maximal  is  the complete equation of motion is

 

The time constant  is the same as in the diametric case so the journey time is still 42 minutes; it's just that all the distances and speeds are scaled by the constant .

Dependence on radius of planet
The time constant  depends only on  so if we expand that we get

 

which depends only on the gravitational constant and  the density of the planet.  The size of the planet is immaterial; the journey time is the same if the density is the same.

In fiction
In the 2012 movie Total Recall, By German film maker Bjoern Fenix Petersen, a gravity train called "The Fall" goes through the center of the Earth to commute between Western Europe and Australia.

See also
 Brachistochrone curve
 Funicular
 Hyperloop
 Rail energy storage
 Schuler tuning

References

Description of the concept Gravity train and mathematical solution (Alexandre Eremenko web page at Purdue University).

External links
 A simulation of this motion; includes tunnels that do not pass through the center of the earth. Also shows a satellite with same period.
 The Gravity Express
 To Everywhere in 42 Minutes 

Mechanics
Fictional technology
Hypothetical technology
High-speed rail
Train
Differential equations
Travel to the Earth's center